The 2014 Labour Party leadership election was held following the resignation of Tánaiste Eamon Gilmore as Leader of the Labour Party in the aftermath the party's poor showing at the local and European elections. A postal ballot was held to elect a successor. Nominations opened on 27 May and closed on 2 June.

Candidates
Two candidates contested the leadership election:
 Joan Burton, Deputy leader and Minister for Social Protection
 Alex White, Minister of State at the Department of Health with responsibility for primary care

Deputy leader
Along with the position of leader, there was also be an election to fill the Deputy leadership that fell vacant on the resignation of the Leader. Four candidates contested it.

Ciara Conway, TD for Waterford
Alan Kelly, Minister of State at the Department of Transport, Tourism and Sport with responsibility for public and commuter transport
Michael McCarthy, TD for Cork South-West
Seán Sherlock, Minister of State at the Department of Education and Skills and at the Department of Jobs, Enterprise and Innovation with responsibility for research and innovation

Debates
There were 5 leadership election debates held across Ireland during the election campaign.

Result
Joan Burton was elected as leader with 78% of the vote. Alan Kelly was elected as deputy leader.

References

2014 elections in the Republic of Ireland
2014 in Irish politics
Labour Party (Ireland)
Labour Party leadership elections (Ireland)
Labour Party leadership election (Ireland)